Grabik may refer to the following places in Poland:
Grabik, Lower Silesian Voivodeship (south-west Poland)
Grabik, Lubusz Voivodeship (west Poland)